The 2020 Indy Pro 2000 Championship will be the 22nd season in series history. An 18-round schedule was announced on 12 September 2019, featuring six permanent road courses, two street circuits, and two ovals.  Except for the two Indianapolis-area rounds, they are NTT IndyCar Series support races.  The Indianapolis road course race is a Stand alone race due to the NASCAR Cup Series Big Machine 400 weekend is combined with the GMR Grand Prix weekend as a double header so that weekend is full, and the Lucas Oil Raceway round, normally held on Indianapolis 500 weekend, is part of the USAC Silver Crown Series Dave Steele Classic round.

RP Motorsport USA withdrew from the series this season because of travel restrictions due to the 2019-20 coronavirus pandemic.

American Sting Ray Robb, driving for Juncos Racing, clinched the championship with two races remaining on the season.

Drivers and teams

Schedule

Race results

Championship standings

Drivers' Championship
Scoring system

 The driver who qualifies on pole is awarded one additional point.
 One point is awarded to the driver who leads the most laps in a race.
 One point is awarded to the driver who sets the fastest lap during the race.

See also
2020 IndyCar Series
2020 Indy Lights (canceled)
2020 U.S. F2000 National Championship

References

External links
 Indy Pro 2000 Championship Official Website

2020
Indy Pro 2000 Championship